Sir Joseph Pope  (August 16, 1854 – December 2, 1926) was a Canadian public servant. He was Private Secretary to Sir John A. Macdonald from 1882 to 1891 and Assistant Clerk to the Privy Council & Under Secretary of State for Canada from 1896 to 1926. From 1909 to 1925, he was the first permanent under-secretary of State for External Affairs.

Pope was appointed a Companion of the Order of St Michael and St George (CMG) during the visit to Canada of TRH the Duke and Duchess of Cornwall and York (later King George V and Queen Mary) in October 1901. He was later knighted as a Knight Commander (KCMG) of the same order.

He married Marie-Louise-Joséphine-Henriette (Minette) Taschereau in Rivière-du-Loup, Que. on October 15, 1884. They had five sons and a daughter. One of his sons, Maurice Arthur Pope, later became a lieutenant general in the Canadian Army.

Pope's life story was edited and completed by his son Maurice Arthur Pope, and was published as "Public servant: the memoirs of Sir Joseph Pope" (Toronto, 1960). Sir Joseph tells the story of his conversion to the Roman Catholic faith from Anglicanism in Why I Became a Catholic, published privately in 1921, and republished by Ignatius Press in 2001.

There is a Joseph Pope fonds at Library and Archives Canada.

References

External links
 Sir Joseph Pope Biography at the Canadian Encyclopedia
 Biography at the Dictionary of Canadian Biography Online
 
 
 
 

1854 births
1926 deaths
19th-century Canadian civil servants
20th-century Canadian civil servants
Canadian Knights Commander of the Order of St Michael and St George
Canadian Companions of the Imperial Service Order
Canadian Commanders of the Royal Victorian Order
Persons of National Historic Significance (Canada)
Converts to Roman Catholicism from Anglicanism